is a Japanese manga series by Oshioshio. It has been serialized since August 2014 in Kadokawa's seinen manga magazine Comic Cune, which was originally a magazine supplement in the seinen manga magazine Monthly Comic Alive until August 2015. As of October 2015, it has been collected in a single tankōbon volume. Sakura Maimai is also available on Kadokawa Corporation's ComicWalker website.

Media

Manga
Sakura Maimai is a four-panel manga  series by Oshioshio. It began serialization in Comic Cune October 2014 issue released on August 27, 2014; At first, Comic Cune was a "magazine in magazine" placed in Monthly Comic Alive, later it became independent of Comic Alive and changed to a formal magazine on August 27, 2015. Sakura Maimai is also available on Kadokawa Corporation's ComicWalker website. As of October 2015, it has been collected in a single tankōbon volume.

References

External links
  
 Sakura Maimai at ComicWalker 

Media Factory manga
Seinen manga
Yonkoma